Methyldiazinol (also known as 3,3-azo-17α-methyl-5α-dihydrotestosterone, 3-azi-17α-methyl-DHT, or 3,3-azo-17α-methyl-5α-androstan-17β-ol) is a synthetic and orally active androgen/anabolic steroid (AAS) which was never marketed. It is a 17α-methylated derivative of dihydrotestosterone (DHT); specifically, it is the C3 azi (i.e., 3,3-azo) analogue of mestanolone (17α-methyl-DHT). The drug has been found to possess a high ratio and dissociation of myotrophic to androgenic activity; relative to methyltestosterone, its ratio was 15 (3:0.2), among the highest observed.

See also 
 List of androgens/anabolic steroids

References 

Abandoned drugs
Tertiary alcohols
Androgens and anabolic steroids
Androstanes
Hepatotoxins
Diazirines